Kladje pri Krmelju is a settlement in the hills northwest of Krmelj in the historical region of Lower Carniola in central Slovenia. It belongs to the Municipality of Sevnica. The municipality is included in the Lower Sava Statistical Region.

Name
The name of the settlement was changed from Kladje to Kladje pri Krmelju in 1953.

References

External links
Kladje pri Krmelju at Geopedia

Populated places in the Municipality of Sevnica